Stocksbridge and Upper Don ward is one of the 28 electoral wards of the borough of Sheffield, South Yorkshire, England.  The population of this ward was 18,541 at the 2011 Census.

The main population centres in the ward are Stocksbridge and Oughtibridge; the ward also includes the villages of Deepcar, Wharncliffe Side, Bolsterstone,  Midhopestones, Upper Midhope and Ewden Village.

Description
The population of this ward in 2011 was 18,541 people in 8,099 households.

Up to the 2010 general election Stocksbridge and Upper Don was one of the wards that made up the Sheffield Hillsborough constituency; at the 2010 election the ward became part of the Stocksbridge and Penistone constituency.

Places in Stocksbridge and Upper Don ward
Stocksbridge is a town in the metropolitan borough of the City of Sheffield. In 2007 the population of the town including Deepcar and Bolsterstone was nearly 14,000. Deepcar is a village adjoining the eastern end of Stocksbridge.

To the south of Stocksbridge are the villages of Bolsterstone, site of a manor house; and further south is Ewden Village, a navvy village established in the early 20th century during the construction of the Sheffield reservoirs.

Oughtibridge is a village to the south east of Stocksbridge, on the main road to Sheffield, in the Upper Don Valley. The village of Wharncliffe Side is located on the main road between Deepcar on Oughtibridge.

Midhopestones (or Nether Midhope), and Upper Midhope (or Over Midhope) are small villages in the western half of the ward, close to the northern border, and near to Midhope reservoir and Langsett reservoirs.

Locations

Stocksbridge 
Deepcar 
Oughtibridge 
Wharncliffe Side 
Bolsterstone 
Ewden village 
Midhopestones 
Upper Midhope

References

External links

Stocksbridge
Wards of Sheffield